Minor Ignacio López Campollo (born 1 February 1987) is a Guatemalan footballer who currently plays for Comunicaciones B in the Primera División de Ascenso. He was also a member of the Guatemala national team, playing in the 2010 and 2014 World Cup qualifying campaigns.

Club career
A tall forward, López was born in Quetzaltenango, and began his professional career in 2007 at local club Xelajú MC, where he scored 14 goals in three seasons. In January 2011 he was acquired by Deportes Naval for that year's season. He made his debut in Chile on 12 March 2011, scoring to give the team a 1-1 draw against Puerto Montt. As the club attempted to earn promotion to the top division, López contributed with 12 goals scored during the 2011 season, including one during the promotion/relegation playoff which Naval lost to Santiago Wanderers.

In January 2012, he was signed by Deportes La Serena of the Chilean 1st division.

In 2014, López was signed to Atlético Clube de Portugal.

International career
In 2006, López was a member of the Guatemala U-20 national team that won the UNCAF U-20 Championship and consequently participated at the U-20 World Cup qualifying tournament the following year. Months later, he played with the U-23 team in the 2008 Olympic Games qualifying campaign, where on 14 March 2008 he scored his team's second goal in a come-from-behind 2-1 win against Mexico which allowed Guatemala to advance to the next round on top of its group and fight for a berth in the final Olympic Tournament against Honduras, whom it lost to on penalty kicks.

His senior international debut occurred on 19 November 2008 under coach "Mincho" Monterroso, playing the last 15 minutes of a 0-2 loss against the United States during 2010 World Cup qualifying. In 2009, he played at the UNCAF Nations Cup, where he scored his first senior international goal against Costa Rica. He has since played regularly with the national team, being rotated in attack with the more experienced strikers Carlos Ruiz and Dwight Pezzarossi during 2014 World Cup qualification, and scoring two goals in the second round.

Career statistics

International goals
Scores and results list Guatemala's goal tally first.

Honours
 Xelajú 2007 (Clausura Championship)

References

External links
 
 
 

1987 births
Living people
Guatemalan footballers
Guatemalan expatriate footballers
Guatemala international footballers
Xelajú MC players
Naval de Talcahuano footballers
Deportes La Serena footballers
Deportivo Marquense players
Comunicaciones F.C. players
Atlético Clube de Portugal players
Atlético Venezuela C.F. players
Ñublense footballers
Primera B de Chile players
Chilean Primera División players
Liga Portugal 2 players
Venezuelan Primera División players
2009 UNCAF Nations Cup players
2013 Copa Centroamericana players
2015 CONCACAF Gold Cup players
Association football forwards
Expatriate footballers in Chile
Expatriate footballers in Portugal
Expatriate footballers in Venezuela
Guatemalan expatriate sportspeople in Chile